Cercina is a frazione (rural borough) of the municipality of Sesto Fiorentino, in the  Metropolitan City of Florence, central Italy, located on the slopes of Mount Morello.

Sights include the Pieve di Sant'Andrea and the Castle of Castiglione, a former possession of the Catellini Castiglione family.

Frazioni of the Province of Florence